Llanrhidian Higher is a local government community in Swansea, south Wales.  The community has its own elected community council.

The area covered by the community council includes the villages of Penclawdd, Crofty, Llanmorlais, Blue Anchor and Wernffrwd. The population of the community taken at the 2011 census was 5218.

Following The Swansea (Communities) Order 2011, the southeast third of Llanrhidian Higher became a separate community of Three Crosses.

See also
 Llanrhidian Lower

References

External links
Gower Community Councils

Communities in Swansea